The SAE steel grades system is a standard alloy numbering system (SAE J1086 - Numbering Metals and Alloys) for steel grades maintained by SAE International.

In the 1930s and 1940s, the American Iron and Steel Institute (AISI) and SAE were both involved in efforts to standardize such a numbering system for steels. These efforts were similar and overlapped significantly. For several decades the systems were united into a joint system designated the AISI/SAE steel grades. In 1995 the AISI turned over future maintenance of the system to SAE because the AISI never wrote any of the specifications.

Today steel quotes and certifications commonly make reference to both SAE and AISI, not always with precise differentiation. For example, in the alloy/grade field, a certificate might refer to "4140", "AISI 4140", or "SAE 4140", and in most light-industrial applications any of the above is accepted as adequate, and considered equivalent, for the job at hand, as long as the specific specification called out by the designer (for example, "4140 bar per ASTM-A108" or "4140 bar per AMS 6349") is certified to on the certificate. The alloy number is simply a general classifier, whereas it is the specification itself that narrows down the steel to a very specific standard.

The SAE steel grade system's correspondence to other alloy numbering systems, such as the ASTM-SAE unified numbering system (UNS), can be seen in cross-referencing tables (including the ones given below).

The AISI system uses a letter prefix to denote the steelmaking process. The prefix "C" denotes open-hearth furnace, electric arc furnace or basic oxygen furnace steels, while "E" specifies only electric arc furnace steel. A letter "L" within the grade name indicates lead as an added ingredient; for example, 12L14 is a common grade that is 1214 with lead added for machinability.

Suffixes may be added to the steel grade which specify the forming process used to create a part. These may include cold working (CDS), hot working (HR), quenching and tempering (Q&T), and other methods.

Carbon steel 

Carbon steels and alloy steels are designated a four digit number, whereby the first digit indicates the main alloying element(s), the second digit indicates tg (top grade) element(s), and the last two digits indicate the amount of carbon, in hundredths of a percent (basis points) by weight. For example, a 1060 steel is a plain-carbon steel containing 0.60 wt% C.

An "H" suffix can be added to any designation to denote hardenability is a major requirement. The chemical requirements are loosened but hardness values defined for various distances on a Jominy test.

Stainless steel

100  Series  

Type 102—austenitic general purpose stainless steel

200 Series—austenitic chromium-nickel-manganese alloys 
Type 201—austenitic that is hardenable

300 Series—austenitic chromium-nickel alloys 
Type 301—highly ductile, for formed products. Also hardens rapidly during mechanical working. Good weldability. Better wear resistance and fatigue strength than 304.
Type 302—same corrosion resistance as 304, with slightly higher strength due to additional carbon.
Type 303—free machining version of 304 via addition of sulfur and phosphorus. Also referred to as "A1" in accordance with ISO 3506.

Type 304—the most common grade; the classic 18/8 (18% chromium, 8% nickel) stainless steel. Outside of the US it is commonly known as "A2 stainless steel", in accordance with ISO 3506 (not to be confused with A2 tool steel). The Japanese equivalent grade of this material is SUS304.
Type 304L—same as the 304 grade but lower carbon content to increase weldability. Is slightly weaker than 304.
Type 304LN—same as 304L, but also nitrogen is added to obtain a much higher yield and tensile strength than 304L.
Type 305—same as 304, but with more nickel to decrease work hardening.
Type 308—used as the filler metal when welding 304.
Type 309—better temperature resistance than 304, also sometimes used as filler metal when welding dissimilar steels, along with inconel.
Type 310 310S— is a highly alloyed austenitic stainless steel used for high temperature application. The high chromium and nickel content give the steel excellent oxidation resistance as well as high strength at high temperature. This grade is also very ductile, and has good weldability enabling its widespread usage in many applications. 
Type 316—the second most common grade (after 304); for food and surgical stainless steel uses; alloy addition of molybdenum prevents specific forms of corrosion. It is also known as marine grade stainless steel due to its increased resistance to chloride corrosion compared to type 304. 316 is often used for building nuclear reprocessing plants.
 Type 316L—is an extra low carbon grade of 316, generally used in stainless steel watches and marine applications, as well exclusively in the fabrication of reactor pressure vessels for boiling water reactors, due to its high resistance to corrosion. Also referred to as "A4" in accordance with ISO 3506.
Type 316Ti—variant of type 316 that includes titanium for heat resistance. It is used in flexible chimney liners.
Type 321—similar to 304 but lower risk of weld decay due to addition of titanium. See also 347 with addition of niobium for desensitization during welding.

400 Series—ferritic and martensitic chromium alloys 
Type 405—ferritic for welding applications
Type 408—heat-resistant; poor corrosion resistance; 11% chromium, 8% nickel.
Type 409—cheapest type; used for automobile exhausts; ferritic (iron/chromium only).
Type 410—martensitic (high-strength iron/chromium). Wear-resistant, but less corrosion-resistant.
Type 416—easy to machine due to additional sulfur
Type 420—Cutlery Grade martensitic; similar to the Brearley's original rustless steel. Excellent polishability.
Type 430—decorative, e.g., for automotive trim; ferritic. Good formability, but with reduced temperature and corrosion resistance.
Type 439—ferritic grade, a higher grade version of 409 used for catalytic converter exhaust sections. Increased chromium for improved high temperature corrosion/oxidation resistance.
Type 440—a higher grade of cutlery steel, with more carbon, allowing for much better edge retention when properly heat-treated. It can be hardened to approximately Rockwell 58 hardness, making it one of the hardest stainless steels. Due to its toughness and relatively low cost, most display-only and replica swords or knives are made of 440 stainless. Available in four grades: 
Type 440A—has the least amount of carbon making this the most stain-resistant.
Type 440B—slightly more carbon than 440A.
Type 440C—has the greatest amount of carbon of the type 440 variants. Strongest and considered more desirable in knifemaking than the Type 440A variant, except for diving or other salt-water applications. This variant is also more readily available than other variants of type 440.
Type 440F—a free-machining variant. Contains the same high carbon content as type 440C.
Type 446—ferritic designed for elevated temperature service and is capable of tolerating molten copper and brass.

500 Series—heat-resisting chromium alloys

600 Series—originally created for proprietary alloys (which are no longer given SAE grade numbers) 
601 through 604: Martensitic low-alloy steels.
610 through 613: Martensitic secondary hardening steels.
614 through 619: Martensitic chromium steels.
630 through 635: Semiaustenitic and martensitic precipitation hardening stainless steels.
Type 630 is most common PH stainless, better known as 17-4; 17% chromium, 4% nickel.
650 through 653: Austenitic steels strengthened by hot/cold work.
660 through 665: Austenitic superalloys; all grades except alloy 661 are strengthened by second-phase precipitation.

900 series—austenitic chromium-molybdenum alloys 
Type 904—similar to 316 but with higher chromium and molybdenum content for more corrosion resistance

Stainless steel designations table

High-strength low-alloy steel

See also
ASTM International
Steel grades
Unified numbering system

References

Bibliography